Joseph Bannon (25 April 1894 - 4 February 1975) was an Irish hurler. Usually lining out as a corner-back, he was a member of the Dublin team that won the All-Ireland Championship in 1924 and 1927.

Bannon enjoyed a lengthy career as a full-back with the Faughs and Young Irelands clubs in Dublin, winning several championship medals.

After being selected for the Dublin senior team in 1923, Bannon was a regular member of the team for much of the next decade. He won his first Leinster medal in 1924 before later winning his first All-Ireland medal after Dublin's defeat of Galway in the final. Bannon won a second set of Leinster and All-Ireland medals in 1927 before winning his third and final provincial title at the age of forty in 1934.

Bannon died on 4 February 1975.

Honours

Dublin
All-Ireland Senior Hurling Championship (2): 1924, 1927
Leinster Senior Hurling Championship (3): 1924, 1927, 1934

References

1894 births
1975 deaths
Faughs hurlers
Young Irelands (Dublin) hurlers
Dublin inter-county hurlers
All-Ireland Senior Hurling Championship winners